Kenneth Campbell,  (21 April 1917 – 6 April 1941) was a Scottish airman who was posthumously awarded the Victoria Cross for an attack that damaged the German battlecruiser Gneisenau, moored in Brest, France, during the Second World War.

Early life
Kenneth Campbell was from Ayrshire and educated at Sedbergh School. He gained a chemistry degree at Clare College, Cambridge, where he was a member of the Cambridge University Air Squadron.

Second World War
In September 1939, Campbell was mobilised for service with the Royal Air Force (RAF) following the outbreak of the Second World War. Flying Officer Campbell joined No. 22 Squadron RAF in September 1940, piloting the Bristol Beaufort torpedo bomber. Campbell torpedoed a merchant vessel near Borkum in March 1941. Days later, he escaped from a pair of Messerschmitt Bf 110 fighters, despite extensive damage to his aircraft. Two days later, on a 'Rover' patrol he torpedoed another vessel, off IJmuiden.

On 6 April 1941 over Brest Harbour, France, Flying Officer Campbell attacked the German battleship Gneisenau.

For the attack to be effective, Campbell would have to time the release to drop the torpedo close to the side of the mole. That Campbell managed to launch his torpedo accurately is testament to his courage and determination. The ship was severely damaged below the waterline and was obliged to return to the dock whence she had come only the day before; she was put out of action for six months, lessening the threat to Allied shipping crossing the Atlantic.

Generally, once a torpedo was dropped, an escape was made by low-level jinking at full throttle. Because of rising ground surrounding the harbour, Campbell was forced into a steep banking turn, revealing the Beaufort's full silhouette to the gunners. The aircraft met a withering wall of flak and crashed into the harbour. The Germans buried Campbell and his three crew mates, Sergeants J. P. Scott DFM RCAF (navigator), R. W. Hillman (wireless operator) and W. C. Mulliss (air gunner), with full military honours. His valour was only recognised when the French Resistance managed to pass along news of his brave deeds to Britain.

Victoria Cross citation
The announcement and accompanying citation for the decoration was published in supplement to the London Gazette on 13 March 1942, reading

Legacy
At a small ceremony in his home town of Saltcoats in Ayrshire on 6 April 2000, the 59th anniversary of Campbell's death at Brest, a memorial plaque and bench were unveiled by his sister-in-law, and his 90-year-old brother handed over his VC to the safekeeping of the commanding officer of the present-day No. 22 Squadron.

The RAF named their original Vickers VC10 aircraft after Victoria Cross holders. XR808 is named after Kenneth Campbell.

A memorial to him stands in his old school, Sedbergh, commemorating his brave deeds.

A room is named after him at the town headquarters of Cambridge University Air Squadron. At RAF Wittering, the RAF base used for flying training by CUAS, the Campbell Building is named after him, which hosts the CUAS and London University Air Squadron offices.

References

Bibliography
 Barker, Ralph. The Ship-Busters: The Story of the R.A.F. Torpedo-Bombers. London: Chatto & Windus Ltd. 1957. No ISBN.
 Robertson, Bruce. Beaufort Special. Shepperton, Surrey, UK: Ian Allan Ltd., 1976. .

External links
 Flying Officer K. Campbell in The Art of War exhibition at the UK National Archives
 Video on BBC for Remembrance Day 11 11 2011

1917 births
1941 deaths
People educated at Sedbergh School
British World War II recipients of the Victoria Cross
Royal Air Force personnel killed in World War II
Royal Air Force officers
British World War II bomber pilots
Royal Air Force Volunteer Reserve personnel of World War II
People from Saltcoats
Royal Air Force recipients of the Victoria Cross
Alumni of Clare College, Cambridge
Aviators killed by being shot down
Scottish airmen